Virginia's 16th House of Delegates district elects one of 100 seats in the Virginia House of Delegates, the lower house of the state's bicameral legislature. District 16 represents the city of Martinsville as well as parts of Henry and Pittsylvania counties. The seat is currently held by Les Adams.

District officeholders

Electoral history

References

Virginia House of Delegates districts
Martinsville, Virginia
Henry County, Virginia
Pittsylvania County, Virginia